Puroskar (English: The Prize) is a 1983 Bangladeshi film starring Bulbul Ahmed and Indian actress (former Miss Kolkata) Jayshri Kabir opposite him. It earned five awards at the 8th Bangladesh National Film Awards.

Soundtrack
"Aaj Kono Kaj Nei" - Samina Chowdhury, Abdul Jabbar
"Harjit Chirodin Thakbe" - Shahnaz Rahmatullah 
"Amader Potaka Amader Maan" - Sabina Yasmin

Awards 
Bangladesh National Film Awards
Best Film - Satya Saha
Best Supporting Actor - Shakil
Best Screenplay - Syed Shamsul Haque
Best Dialogue - Syed Shamsul Haque
Best Cinematographer - Anwar Hossain

References

1983 films
Bengali-language Bangladeshi films
Best Film National Film Award (Bangladesh) winners
Films scored by Satya Saha
1980s Bengali-language films
Films whose writer won the Best Screenplay National Film Award (Bangladesh)